Tentulkuli is a census town in Domjur CD Block of Howrah Sadar subdivision in Howrah district in the Indian state of West Bengal. It is close to Salap and also a part of Kolkata Urban Agglomeration.

Geography

Demographics
As per 2011 Census of India Tentulkuli had a total population of 7,203 of which 3,685 (51%) were males and 3,518 (49%) were females. Population below 6 years was 655. The total number of literates in Tentulkuli was 5,746 (87.75% of the population over 6 years).

Tentulkuli was part of Kolkata Urban Agglomeration in 2011 census.

 India census, Tentulkuli had a population of 5122. Males constitute 51% of the population and females 49%. Tentulkuli has an average literacy rate of 68%, higher than the national average of 59.5%: male literacy is 74% and female literacy is 62%. In Tentulkuli, 11% of the population is under 6 years of age.

Transport
National Highway 16 (part of Asian Highway 45) passes beside Tentulkuli.

Bus

Private Bus
 40 Birshibpur - Serampore
 79 Panchla - Dunlop
Many Shuttle Buses (Without Numbers) also pass through Tentulkuli.

Train
Dansi railway station is the nearest railway station on Howrah-Amta line.

References

Cities and towns in Howrah district
Neighbourhoods in Kolkata
Kolkata Metropolitan Area